Atilio Badalini (12 May 1899 – 3 September 1953) was an Argentine footballer. He played in one match for the Argentina national football team in 1916. He was also part of Argentina's squad for the 1920 South American Championship.

References

External links
 

1899 births
1953 deaths
Argentine footballers
Argentina international footballers
Place of birth missing
Association football forwards
Newell's Old Boys footballers
Club Atlético Colón footballers